The Czechoslovak War Cross 1918 (Československý válečný kříž 1918 in Czech, Československý vojnový kríž 1918 in Slovak) is a military decoration of the former state of Czechoslovakia which was issued for acts of military valour during the years of the First World War.

Description 
The medal was first created on November 7, 1918, and issued to Czechoslovak citizens and also, upon application, to citizens of Germany and Austria who had served in the Czechoslovak armed forces ( e.g. Czechoslovak Legions) during the years of the Great War with distinction and bravery, and also during border conflicts with Poland and Hungary.

The Czechoslovak War Cross was also, on occasion, issued to veterans of the Allied powers who had played a large role in World War I and were considered contributors to the formation of the Czechoslovak state. John J. Pershing was one such recipient of the Czechoslovak War Cross.

It was also awarded to the capital city of Serbia, Belgrade, on October 8, 1925.

Design 
The medal was die-struck and high in detail, with a bronze finish. On the obverse of the cross was the symbols of the lands in circles – the symbol of the Bohemia above, Slovakia below, Moravia left and Silesia to the right. On the reverse the circles featured vermeil linden leaves, with the letters "ČS" (Československo, meaning Czechoslovakia) in the middle. The medal was suspended from a white ribbon with red stripes.

See also 
Czechoslovak War Cross 1939–1945

References

External links 
 Czechoslovak war cross 1918

Military awards and decorations of Czechoslovakia
Awards established in 1918
1918 establishments in Czechoslovakia